Stoddartsville Historic District is a national historic district located at Buck Township, Luzerne County, Pennsylvania.  The district includes 36 contributing buildings, 14 contributing sites, and one contributing structure in the 19th-century milling and transportation center of Stoddartsville.  It includes houses and summer cottages, outbuildings and wells, and the remains of mills and mill races, barn ruins, and the ruins of "bear trap locks" and wing dams.

Notable contributing resources include the remains of Stoddart's Grist Mill and related archaeological sites, remains of Stoddart's Saw Mill (1815), "Appleyard" house (c. 1815), "Miller's House" (1890-1893), the Inn (c. 1875), and the Stoddart House or "The Maples" (c. 1810).

It was added to the National Register of Historic Places in 1998.

History 
Stoddartsville was founded by John Stoddart in 1815, who partnered with Josiah White (of the Lehigh Valley Coal Co.) to improve navigation on the Lehigh River. Stoddart imagined a canal town with mills, shops, taverns and homes. The dams only allowed for a one-way canal, which was not ideal because arriving barges would need to be broken up and sold. As the mining industry in Luzerne County grew, two-way canals became an option, and Stoddart had hoped to extend a two-way canal by 12 miles from White Haven to Stoddartsville, but plans were abandoned when the estimated cost for such expansion to the Lehigh Coal and Navigation Company was deemed too great. Over the years, the town became a vacation community filled with cottages.

Stoddartsville saw its share of misfortune, from floods in 1862 and fires in the 1950s. With the growth of resorts in the Pocono Mountains, visitors to Stoddartsville waned and it became a private, residential area.

Preservation 

Through the efforts of John L. Butler Jr., the village of Stoddartsville was placed on the National Register of Historic Places on November 12, 1998. As direct descendants of John Stoddart, the Butler family has had close ties to Stoddartsville for generations. During his lifetime, John Butler Jr. amassed a collection of artifacts, photographs, and documentation of the village. In 2001, John and Haney Butler began construction of a Historic Center and hosted tours to share the history of Stoddartsville. Mr. Butler retained ownership of the Historic Center and Stoddartsville Cemetery until his death in August 2010, shortly after the founding of the Stoddartsville Preservation Society Inc. (SPS). The SPS acquired both properties in 2011 and continues to hold tours and meetings with a mission to preserve Stoddartsville and carry on his legacy. The Historic Center is open for visitors on the first Saturday during the months of May through October, or by appointment. For more information, please visit https://www.stoddartsvillepreservationsociety.com/ or http://tobyhannatwphistory.org/stoddartsville.html
  
As of November 2021, 288 cemetery burials have been documented and can be found on Find a Grave.
https://www.findagrave.com/cemetery/2140177/stoddartsville-cemetery
 
Among land holdings of John Butler Jr. was 90.190 acres along the Lehigh River in Luzerne County.  To preserve this part of Stoddartsville, in March 2001, he entered into a Legal Agreement with the Wildlands Conservancy. https://www.wildlandspa.org/  This property is to be perpetually protected and never developed or used for any commercial use regardless of any future ownership.

References

Historic districts on the National Register of Historic Places in Pennsylvania
Historic districts in Luzerne County, Pennsylvania
National Register of Historic Places in Luzerne County, Pennsylvania